Trinity Lutheran School may refer to:
Trinity Lutheran School (Bend, Oregon)
Trinity Lutheran School (Evansville, Indiana)
Trinity Lutheran School (Harris County, Texas)
Trinity Lutheran School (Kaukauna, Wisconsin)
Trinity Lutheran School (Lincoln, Nebraska)
Trinity Lutheran School (Newport News, Virginia)
Trinity Lutheran School (Orlando, Florida)
Trinity Lutheran School (Monroe, Michigan)
Trinity Lutheran School (Wellsboro, Pennsylvania)
Trinity Lutheran School (St. George, Utah)